Deus Kaseke (born 27 August 1994) is a Tanzanian football striker who plays for Young Africans.

References

1994 births
Living people
Tanzanian footballers
Tanzania international footballers
Polisi FC players
Mbeya City F.C. players
Young Africans S.C. players
Singida United F.C. players
Association football forwards
Tanzanian Premier League players
Tanzania A' international footballers
2020 African Nations Championship players